The 1952 Aer Lingus C-47 accident occurred on 10 January 1952, in Wales. The C-47 operated by Aer Lingus was en-route from London to Dublin when the aircraft suddenly went into a dive and crashed near Llyn Gwynant. All twenty passengers and three crew died in the crash. It was determined that the aircraft had flown into a mountain wave triggered by Snowdon resulting in loss of control. To date the accident is the second deadliest commercial airliner crash in Wales, the first fatal accident of Aer Lingus, and the second deadliest crash involving Aer Lingus.

References

Aviation accidents and incidents in Wales
1952 disasters in the United Kingdom
Aer Lingus accidents and incidents
1952 in Wales
1952 disasters in Europe